Clear Lake is a village in Polk County, Wisconsin, United States. The population was 1,070 at the 2010 census. The village is adjacent to the Town of Clear Lake along U.S. Highway 63.

Geography
Clear Lake is located at  (45.250315, -92.271909).

Demographics

2010 census
As of the census of 2010,  1,070 people, 459 households, and 282 families lived in the village. The racial makeup of the village was 97.4% White, 0.1% Native American, 0.2% Asian], 0.9% from other races, and 1.4% from two or more races. Hispanics or Latinos of any race were 2.8% of the population.

Of the 459 households, 30.5% had children under 18 living with them, 42.7% were married couples living together, 13.1% had a female householder with no husband present, 5.7% had a male householder with no wife present, and 38.6% were not families. About 33.6% of all households were made up of individuals, and 14.4% had someone living alone who was 65 or older. The average household size was 2.32, and the average family size was 2.94.

The median age in the village was 37.9 years. About 25.8% of residents were under 18, 7.1% were 18 to 24, 24.5% were 25 to 44, 26.4% were 45 to 64, and 16% were 65 or older. The gender makeup of the village was 48.8% male and 51.2% female.

2000 census
As of the census of 2000, 1,051 people, 453 households, and 261 families were residing in the village. The population density was 397.1 people per square mile (153.1/km2). The 478 housing units had an average density of 180.6 per square mile (69.6/km2). The racial makeup of the village was 97.91% White, 0.57% Native American, 0.19% Asian, 0.57% from other races, and 0.76% from two or more races. About 3.14% of the population were Hispanics or Latinos of any race.

Of the 453 households, 27.4% had children under 18 living with them, 46.6% were married couples living together, 8.6% had a female householder with no husband present, and 42.2% were not families. About 36.0% of all households were made up of individuals, and 23.6% had someone living alone who was 65 or older. The average household size was 2.30, and the average family size was 3.03.

In the village, the age distribution was 24.5% under 18, 8.5% from 18 to 24, 26.3% from 25 to 44, 18.7% from 45 to 64, and 22.1% who were 65 or older. The median age was 39 years. For every 100 females, there were 90.7 males. For every 100 females 18 and over, there were 88.2 males.

The median income for a household in the village was $32,269, and for a family was $44,219. Males had a median income of $31,313 versus $22,917 for females. The per capita income for the village was $16,564. About 4.1% of families and 7.5% of the population were below the poverty line, including 5.1% of those under age 18 and 12.3% of those age 65 or over.

Culture
 Clear Lake has 18 Christian churches, representing eight denominations.
 The Clear Lake All-Veteran's Memorial in Clear Lake Cemetery commemorates 1,700 local veterans on seven granite monuments.
 Clear Lake High School has posted only individual state champions in track and field and wrestling.
 Clear Lake is home to a five-time state champion and two-time global champion Destination ImagiNation team.
 In November 2007, a Hollywood film titled Clear Lake, WI, starring Michael Madsen, was filmed in the Clear Lake area.

Notable people
 Burleigh Grimes - Hall of Fame Major League Baseball pitcher and manager (1916–1935)
 Adam M. Jarchow - lawyer and politician
 Gaylord Nelson - former Wisconsin governor and United States senator, founder of Earth Day

References

External links
 The Official Clear Lake, Wisconsin website
 The Clear Lake Community Club Website
 Clear Lake Schools website

Villages in Polk County, Wisconsin
Villages in Wisconsin